Morris Richard Jeppson (June 23, 1922 – March 30, 2010) was a Second Lieutenant in the United States Army Air Forces during World War II. He served as assistant weaponeer on the Enola Gay, which dropped the first atomic bomb on the city of Hiroshima, Japan on August 6, 1945.

Early life
Jeppson was born in Logan, Utah, and studied physics at the University of Nevada, Reno. After enlisting in the United States Army Air Corps in 1942 at the age of 19 and basic training in Florida, he received electrical engineering training at Yale University, Harvard University and MIT. He then worked on bomb firing mechanisms with Los Alamos scientists at Wendover Air Force Base, Utah.

The Hiroshima mission
Second Lieutenant Jeppson, along with then Captain William "Deak" Parsons of the U.S. Navy were responsible for arming the atomic bomb "Little Boy" on the Boeing B-29 Superfortress bomber during the flight from Tinian to Japan. The bomb was protected from premature in-flight detonation by inserting three safety plugs into the electrical connection from its internal battery to the firing mechanism. This was designed to prevent a firing voltage from reaching the mechanism. Each plug was about the size and shape of a car cigarette lighter (approximately three inches in length), with a green cap for the safety plug and a red cap for the arming plug. Jeppson's role was to climb into the bomb bay and remove the three green safety plugs from the bomb and to replace them with the three red plugs just before the aircraft climbed to high altitude close the target area, a job that later caused controversy. With the actions of switching these plugs, Jeppson became the last person to handle the “Little Boy” bomb. He clarified this in the BBC documentary Hiroshima.

Later life and career
In September 1945, Jeppson was awarded the Silver Star in recognition of his service to his country. During the 1950s he worked as a scientist at Lawrence Livermore National Laboratory in California developing hydrogen thermonuclear weapons. Later in his career, he helped develop several key technological breakthroughs including microwave technology as well as stabilizers used on helicopters. After retiring from his work as a physicist, Jeppson lived in Las Vegas with his second wife Mollie.

For many years, Jeppson refused to speak publicly about the Hiroshima mission for fear of reprisal against himself and his family. Starting in 1985, he became more willing to speak about it. On the 40th anniversary of the dropping of the bomb, Jeppson granted an interview and recounted his part in the mission.

In June 2002, a controversy over the sale of a set of safety plugs Jeppson had kept since the mission occurred. After the mission Jeppson had kept one of each in his possession. The plugs were offered for sale in an auction, however the U.S. government tried to halt the sale, claiming they were classified secret material. U.S. District Court Judge Susan Illston rejected the claim by the government clearing the way for the sale. The plugs were eventually sold to retired physicist Clay Perkins for $167,000.

A reunion for the 60th anniversary in 2005 which was supposed to take place on the island of Guam had been in the planning stages, but never materialized. Time Magazine published an in-depth issue commemorating the 60th anniversary of the dropping of the bombs on Japan.  Jeppson and other crew members gave accounts of their experiences. Jeppson also gave an account of his role in the mission in the BBC drama documentary Hiroshima in 2005 and his removal of the safety plugs was portrayed by an actor.

Death
Jeppson died on March 30, 2010, in Las Vegas. He is survived by his wife, brother, three children, five grandchildren and three great grandchildren. With Jeppson's death, Theodore Van Kirk became the last surviving Enola Gay crew member (Van Kirk died on July 28, 2014).

References

External links
Enola Gay crew member Jeppson remembers famed flight, Las Vegas Sun, 25 May 2000
Local Veteran Has Place in History, KLAS, 11 November 2003
Eyewitness to Hiroshima, Time, 1 August 2005
The Day the Bomb Dropped, Pahrump Valley Times, 5 August 2005
Sapian Tribune, No Regrets, 6 August 2005
Interview with Enola Gay crew member Morris Jeppson, The Mainichi Daily News, 4 August 2009
Morris R. Jeppson's obituary
Morris R. Jeppson papers, MSS 7662 at L. Tom Perry Special Collections, Brigham Young University

1922 births
2010 deaths
United States Army Air Forces personnel of World War II
Scientists from Logan, Utah
Recipients of the Silver Star
People from the Las Vegas Valley
United States Army Air Forces officers
People associated with the atomic bombings of Hiroshima and Nagasaki
Recipients of the Air Medal
Lawrence Livermore National Laboratory staff
American people of Norwegian descent
American people of Scottish descent